Ren Wei (born 9 June 1983) is a Chinese businessman and racing driver  who currently competes in the FIA GT1 World Championship for Exim Bank Team China Porsche.  Ren entered motorsports in 2010 with the China Formula Grand Prix open wheel series before progressing to the Chinese Volkswagen Scirocco R-Cup in 2011.  In 2012 Ren debuted in international racing with the Porsche Carrera Cup Asia, before being signed by Mühlner Motorsport for the FIA GT1 World Championship as part of the Exim Bank Team China squad.  Ren is the second Chinese driver in the GT1 series after Ho-Pin Tung, and the first natural-born Chinese to participate.

Complete GT1 World Championship results

* Season still in progress.

References

1983 births
Living people
Sportspeople from Beijing
Chinese racing drivers
FIA GT1 World Championship drivers